Mine de rien is a French Comedy directed by Mathias Mlekuz, released in 2020.

Plot 
In a small town in northern France, a long-running mine is closing work, leaving dozens of people without jobs. Not giving up, following the relocation of the company that promised to rehire them, the workers hold a sit-in in front of the site. Faced with a dilemma of the town's mayor, who threatens to seize the land, they come up with the idea to transform the old mine into an amusement park.

Cast 
 Arnaud Ducret: Arnault
 Philippe Rebbot: Di Lello
 Mélanie Bernier: Stella
 Hélène Vincent: Thérèse, Arnault's Mother
 Rufus: Roger Morels
 Marianne Garcia: Bernadette
 Cyril Aubin: René
 Rebecca Finet: The Mayor
 Mohamed Makhtoumi: Roschdy
 Josef Mlekuz: Kévin
 Philippe Cabrelli: Cédric, Bernadette's Son
 Sophie Bourdon: Isabelle, Arnault's Ex-Wife
 Patrick Rocca: Lucien Borowjack
 Anthony Lequet: Victor
 Yanis Richard: Johan
 Gaëlle Fraysse: Sarah, Di Lello's Wife
 François Godart: Jean-Frédéric
 Tassadit Mandi: Madame Zelmani, Roschdy's Mother
 Fabio Zenoni: Police Officer #1
 Laurent Dauvillée: Police Officer #2

Inspiration 
The director claims to have been inspired by the comedies of Yves Robert, Ettore Scola, Peter Cattaneo, and Ernst Lubitsch.

Filming 
The filming took place from December to January 2019, primarily in Lens, Loos-en-Gohelle, and Liévin.

Awards 

 2020 L'Alpe d'Huez Film Festival: Audience award

Box office 
The film was released on February 26, 2020, in 304 theatres, and sold 14,598 tickets for its first day. The film's weekend opening sold a total of 67,070 tickers. The week following sold a total of 84,133.

The overall consensus was that the film had a weak opening, affected in part by the Coronavirus.

During its first free broadcast on television on the C8 channel, the film garnered a total of 810,000 viewers.

See also 
 The Full Monty

References 

Films about mining
Films about labour
2020s French-language films
French comedy films
2020 films
2020s French films
2020 comedy films